Susan Binau (née Bøje Rasmussen) born March 15, 1964, in Copenhagen, Denmark, is a global philanthropist, published author, motivational speaker, businesswoman, and cancer survivor. A past Miss Universe Denmark and Miss International Friendship, Binau has since developed resources for families to use when coping with grief and the death or imminent death (hospice care) of a friend or family member.

Family and education
Binau and her sister Helle Bøje Holm, were born to mother Jytte Anna Christiansen and (late) father Peter Bøje Rasmussen. Binau is the mother to four children: Christina Binau Bonnor (born 1988), Malene Binau Bonnor (born 1991), Christian Binau Bonnor (born 1996) and Anders Frederik Binau (born 2004). She married investor and music producer Alan Binau in August 2004. The couple divorced in 2016.

Binau's education includes degrees from Roskilde University, Master in Adult Education and Human Resource Development; Danmarks Pædagogiske Universitet, P.D. (Bachelor) Educational planner, and an Adult Teaching Degree (Aarhus Universitet Danmarks Lærerhøjskole). In addition, Binau completed marketing and leadership training through the Danish Bachelor of Commerce accreditation program, and holds a certification in cognitive behavioral and psychological testing: Myers-Briggs Type Indicator, Jungian Type Index, Belbin Self Perception Inventory, and Occupational Personality Questionnaires.

Awards and accolades
USA 2014, 2015: National Association of Professional Women "Woman of the year" 
Canada 2012: Honored as a WOMAN OF ACTION and 'alumna of The World Hub for Women Leaders' By A Celebration of Women, Canada.
Denmark 2009: Business Award. Danish Minister of Education, Inger Stojberg, awarded the inaugural North Zealand Business Award to Binau's Company (Vfactor A/S) in recognition of the company's progressive leadership programs for women.
Miss Universe Denmark, 1985
Miss Friendship, at the 25th International Pageant (Japan, September 15, 1985)

Angels Package
As a result of a cancer diagnosis in October 2006, Binau began to consider other ways that she could put her experience and energy to work to help families of seriously ill patients. She had envisioned how "easy", simple and important it would be to create a "hands on tool" that hospital staff could distribute to terminally ill patients and their loved ones. That vision became a reality when she developed the Angels Package.

When this project began, Binau did not have a budget to work with; she spray painted the first angels in her garage in Florida, then brought the first prototypes with her in a suitcase to Denmark. At this time, her father was dying and Binau arrived just in time to say goodbye. As the first recipient of an Angel Package, he was surrounded by angels and calming music from MusiCure when he died. This loss taught Binau some important lessons that she later described in the national Danish newspaper Søndagsavisen. The life lessons learned through this difficult time were integral to the development of Binau's short publication "Dignity in the final hours" (Vaerdighed I sidste stund).

Building awareness
In the following years, Binau embraced a role as "the voice of the families and children", advocating and participating as much as possible in the media, and on national television and radio to build awareness about the needs and challenges of families facing terminal or serious illness.

After facing serious illness in their own relationship and understanding that sharing their own experience may help other couples with the difficult challenges encountered during the illness of a partner, Binau and her husband Alan Binau co-authored the book Till Sickness Do Us Part – How Love Survives in Difficult Times, published by Gads Forlag.

Addressing the difficult topics of illness, death and dying in her books was a way to create awareness of harmful cultural taboos. Sharing her own experiences and the experiences of her family opened much needed community and international dialog on this topic, ultimately leading to speaking engagements throughout Denmark and beyond. Through these engagements, Binau speaks to patients, patient families, and healthcare professionals to provide motivation, inspiration, and guidance.

Cancer survivor and entrepreneur
During chemotherapy Binau co-founded the company Vfactor A/S with Charlotte Alexandra Pedersen. This was something that Binau and Pederson had planned and discussed for a long time, and they persisted in this work and vision despite the challenges presented by Binau's chemotherapy treatments and recovery from surgery.

Binau is credited with developing new educational concepts including "Value Academy" and "Charter Academy", and building a strong mentor network of CEOs of some of the most prominent Danish companies. Within the first couple of years, the client-base and vast network of Vfactor A/S had grown to include some of Denmark's largest corporations including AP Møller Mærsk and Microsoft. The company also established successful collaborations with notable politicians.

Advocate
In 2009 Binau made the decision to fully focus on being an advocate for families dealing with terminal illness. In an article written by Amy Patt, Binau emphasized how important it is to share experiences with like-minded people (patients, families, and friends) to avoid loneliness and isolation. This concept was the driving motivator behind Binau's success in founding charities on two continents while working with minimal financial resources.

Charities for families
In 2011 Binau founded the Danish charity Landsforeningen Støtte før Afskeden, together with composer Niels Eje. The MusiCure CD sampler included in the patient donation package is an important component. The music consists of soundscapes which use a scientifically based method to induce calm and soothing therapeutic effects in listeners.

Also in 2011, Binau founded USA-based AngelKIT Foundation.

Previously, Binau founded and managed another charity, the Female Courage Foundation.

Kids helping kids
In 2013, Binau's nine-year-old son Andy (Anders) handed her a book called Max the Super Dog's Pet Shop Adventures. Andy said that he wanted to give his mother a helping hand: "My mother had created a book about cancer for the adults in the hospitals. So I thought that there was a lack of a book for children, who must lose one they care about, and then I started to do it." This booklet, about a 'superpup', was created as an activity book to be given as a gift for hospitalized children. It later became an important part of a donation program, the AngelKID Heart Package (HJERTEPAKKE package), for children who have a terminally ill relative.

The AngelKID package program was launched through the Danish Charity founded by Binau, Landsforeningen Støtte Før Afskeden (National Association for Support Before Parting). The launch was publicized during a national bus campaign and on national television, with Ambassador Cecilie Lind (age 25) and her sister Fiona (age 9), sisters who lost their mother in 2012 after a short battle with cancer. The book Max the Super Dog's Adventures and Heart Package Donations were further publicized by Susan and Andy Binau during a fall 2014 campaign in Denmark.

Heart Packages (Hjertepakken, Danish) have been donated to over 1000 children.

The project received support from several large foundations including Harboefonden, Tømrerhandler Johannes Fog Fonden, Fonden Brand af 1849], Møenbrogaard Fonden, and OLE KIRKS FOND, a Danish charity named after the founder of Lego, Ole Kirk.

In 2012, Binau partnered with Danish Actor Christian Heldbo Wienborg to begin fundraising and production of an international television documentary program designed to demonstrate that discussing, understanding, preparing for, and coping with the death of loved ones is a natural part of life and should not be a cultural taboo.

Speaking career
An experienced speaker, Binau has traveled internationally to share her personal and professional experiences and successes with patients, patient families, healthcare professionals, and other audiences around the globe. Her time is split between homes in the US and Europe.

Author

Books

Danish books:
 Mor Må Jeg Få Din Pc, Hvis Du Dør? – Susan Binau, Alan Binau
 Til sygdom os skiller E-bog│Sådan overlever kærligheden, når det er svært
 Mor, Mor må jeg få din pc, hvis du dør?- stemmer fra en sygdomsramt familie  (2nd edition), Forlaget Indblik, 2012
 LØVEN OG MARGUERITRUTEN – FIND DIN NETVÆRKSSTIL. Find your networking style, Ceoneo Books, 2008
 En værdig afsked - bogen om døden, MD Klara Balling and Susan Binau. Morpho Publishing, 2009

The Caring Soul Series is a collection of three inspirational self-help books, which are based on true stories and focus on people dealing with challenging life experiences ranging from serious illness through death and grieving.  
 Mommy, Can I Call You in Heaven?: How we coped with cancer as a family
 Till sickness do us part–how love survives difficult times, Gads Forlag, 2009
 The Art of Dying - writing your own final chapter

The books in the Super Dog Zam Grief series offer families with grieving children a self-help tool to use at home. The workbooks were developed specifically for three different age groups: 3–5, 6–8, and 9–12 years. The books were co-authored by Binau's youngest son, Andy Binau (creator of The Super Dog ZAM and author of My Doggy Diary), and daughter, Malene Shak (a certified Montessori teacher).

 The Parent's Guide – how to support your grieving child
 The Super Dog ZAM ages 3-5: A helping paw for grieving children
 The Super Dog ZAM ages 6-8: a helping pal for grieving children
 The Super Dog ZAM ages 9-12: A companion for grieving children

Other publications
 A dignified passing - an inspirational booklet for relatives of a terminally ill or dying patient, Landsforeningen Stoette for Afskeden, 2013

Community volunteer contributions
Florida Hospital Hospice
Commissioned Stephen Minister, Presbyterian Church (Celebration, Florida)
Community Hope Center serving the homeless of Osceola County, Florida
Co-facilitator of a grief group for children, "Grief Healing for Kids", Presbyterian Church (Celebration, Florida)

External links
Susan Binau (personal)
 Landsforeningen Støtte før Afskeden
Community Hope Center of Osceola County, Florida
Florida Hospital Hospice Care, Stephen Ministries
A Celebration of Women
Gads Forlag (publisher)
Author bio at Amazon

References

1964 births
Danish women writers
Danish family and parenting writers
Founders of charities
20th-century Danish businesswomen
20th-century Danish businesspeople
21st-century Danish businesswomen
21st-century Danish businesspeople
Grief
Living people
Miss International 1985 delegates
Miss Universe 1985 contestants
Motivational writers
Women motivational writers